Trewynnard may refer to:

William Trewynnard, Member (MP) of the Parliament of England for Helston in 1542.
James Trewynnard, Member (MP) of the Parliament of England for Liskeard 1529, Newport, Cornwall 1547 and Penryn November 1554.

See also
Elizabeth Trewinnard
Trewinnard